Olmito and Olmito is a census-designated place (CDP) in Starr County, Texas, United States. It is a new CDP formed from part of the old La Victoria CDP prior to the 2010 census with a population of 271.

Geography
Olmito and Olmito is located at  (26.340011, -98.641971).

Education
It is in the Rio Grande City Grulla Independent School District (formerly Rio Grande City Consolidated Independent School District)

References

Census-designated places in Starr County, Texas